DDW may refer to:

 D.D. Williamson, a global food ingredient company
 Dartmouth Debate Workshop, a summer program
 Dutch Design Week  is an annual event about design, hosted in Eindhoven
 Deuterium-depleted water, water with less heavy water than in natural water.

See also 
ddw, ISO 639-3 code of the Dawera-Daweloor language of Indonesia